KVSV is a full service formatted broadcast radio station licensed to Beloit, Kansas, serving North-Central Kansas.  KVSV is owned and operated by McGrath Publishing Company.

1190 AM is a United States and Mexican clear-channel frequency.

References

External links
 KVSV Radio AM1190 Online

1979 establishments in Kansas
Full service radio stations in the United States
Radio stations established in 1979
VSV